Bergt is a surname. Notable people with the surname include:

 Bengt Bergt (born 1982), German drummer and politician
 Laura Bergt (1940–1984), Native Alaskan politician and activist
 Robert Bergt (1930–2011), American violinist

See also
 Berg (surname)